Balázs Ander (born 11 December 1976) is a Hungarian politician, vice-president of Jobbik and member of National Assembly since 2014.

Early life 
Ander was born in Nagyatád. He graduated from the Faculty of Humanities of the University of Pécs. He was a history teacher in Barcs. He is married and raised three children.

Political career 
He has been the president of Jobbik's Barcs group. In 2010, he was member of General Assembly of Somogy. Since 2014 he is a member of National Assembly.

On 25 January 2020, Ander was elected for vice president of Jobbik.

References 

1976 births
Members of the National Assembly of Hungary (2014–2018)
Living people
Members of the National Assembly of Hungary (2018–2022)
University of Pécs alumni
People from Nagyatád
Jobbik politicians